Shabbir Dhankot is an Indian ten-pin bowling player. In 2015 under 23rd Asian Championship, Shabbir won first-ever medal for India in any Asian Championship by winning a Silver. He had earlier won bronze in 2011 Commonwealth Tenpin Bowling Championship in Team event.

References

 Indian ten-pin bowling players
Bowlers at the 2010 Asian Games
Bowlers at the 2018 Asian Games
Asian Games competitors for India